Janice May Udry (born 1928) is an American author. She was born in Jacksonville, Illinois and graduated from Northwestern University in 1950. Her first book, A Tree is Nice, was awarded the Caldecott Medal in 1957 for Marc Simont's illustrations.  Her papers are held at the University of Southern Mississippi.

Bibliography
 A Tree Is Nice (Illustrated by Marc Simont)
 Emily's Autumn (Illustrated by Erik Blegvad)
 Thump and Plunk
 Let's Be Enemies (Illustrated by Maurice Sendak)
 What Mary Jo Shared
 The Sunflower Garden
 Alfred
 The Moon Jumpers (Illustrated by Maurice Sendak)

References

External links
 Janice May Udry – HarperCollins

1928 births
Living people
People from Jacksonville, Illinois
Northwestern University alumni
20th-century American women writers
21st-century American women